The House of Li was the ruling house of the Western Liang dynasty and the Tang dynasty of China.

Family information
The Li family originated in the Longxi Commandery and had Han ethnic origins. They were also known as the Longxi Li lineage (隴西李氏), which included the famous Tang poet Li Bai. The Li family were members of the northwest military aristocracy prevalent during the Sui dynasty.

According to the official records of Tang dynasty, the Li family was paternally descended from the famous Daoist sage Laozi (whose personal name was Li Dan or Li Er), as well as the Han dynasty General Li Guang, and Li Gao, the ethnic Han ruler of Western Liang dynasty. During the late Northern and Southern dynasties period, the Li family intermarried with Xianbei royalty when Li Bing (the ethnically Han father of the first Tang emperor) married the part-Xianbei Duchess Dugu (the daughter of prominent Xianbei general Dugu Xin). Marriages between elite Han men and Xianbei princesses were common in this period, as the Northern Wei had arranged for Han elites to marry daughters of the Xianbei Tuoba imperial family since the 480s CE. More than half of the Tuoba Xianbei princesses of the Northern Wei were married to Han men from the imperial families and aristocrats from the Southern dynasties, who had defected and moved north to join the Northern Wei.

The Khagans of the Yenisei Kyrgyz Khaganate also claimed Longxi Li ancestry, through descent from the Han dynasty general Li Ling. Li Ling, a grandson of Li Guang, had defected from the Han dynasty to the Xiongnu in the first century BCE. For this reason, the Kyrgyz Khagan was recognized as a member of the Tang imperial family. Emperor Zhongzong of Tang even said to the Kyrgyz that "Your nation and Ours are of the same ancestral clan (Zong). You are not like other foreigners."

The Tang Imperial family was watched over by the Zongcheng si (宗正寺). Other prominent members of the Longxi Li lineage from the Tang period included generals Li Jing and Li Jiongxiu, chancellors Li Yiyan, Li Kui, Li Wei, Li Fengji, and Li Zhaode, the official Li Zhongyan, and the poet Li Bai. The Tang Imperial Longxi Li lineage also included sub lineages like the Guzang Li (姑臧 ), from which Li Zhuanmei (李專美) came from, who served the Later Jin.

During the Tang dynasty the Li family of Zhaojun (趙郡李氏), the Cui clan of Boling, the Cui clan of Qinghe, the Lu clan of Fanyang, the Zheng family of Xingyang (滎陽鄭氏), the Wang family of Taiyuan (太原王氏), and the Li family of Longxi (隴西李氏) were the seven noble families between whom marriage was banned by law.

In more recent times, some scholars have speculated that the Tang imperial family might have modified its genealogy to conceal Xianbei heritage. They cite as an example the Northern Zhou General Li Xian, who claimed descent from the Han general Li Ling, but whose tomb indicates that he had distant Xianbei ancestry. There is however no direct evidence that the Tang imperial family carried out such actions.

Some of the Tang dynasty Imperial family's cadet branches ended up in Fujian. The branch founded by Li Dan (李丹) became prominent during the Song dynasty, as did another founded by Li Fu (李富). Descendants of the Tang Emperors now live in Chengcun village, near the Wuyi Mountains in Fujian.

During the Later Jin dynasty of the Five Dynasties period, there were dukedoms (二王三恪) established for the descendants of the Northern Zhou, Sui, and Tang imperial families.

The Hu family of Xidi are descended from Hu Shiliang, of Wuyuan, who was a descendant of Hu Changyi, a son of Emperor Zhaozong of Tang who was adopted by the Wuyuan Hu family.

People
Li Xin
Li Guang
Li Ling
Li Rangyi
Li Fengji
Li Wei (Tang dynasty)
Li Yiyan
Li Hui (Tang dynasty)
Li Shi (Tang dynasty)
Li Yuanhong (Tang chancellor)
Li Ke
Benjamin Li

Family tree

See also
Tang dynasty
List of emperors of the Tang dynasty
Li (surname 李)

References

Chinese monarchs
Han Chinese people
Surnames